The Wharton School of the University of Pennsylvania is the business school of the University of Pennsylvania, a private Ivy League research university in Philadelphia. The school was established in 1881 through a donation from Joseph Wharton. Considered one of the most prestigious business schools in the world, the Wharton School is the world's oldest collegiate business school.

The Wharton School awards the Bachelor of Science with a school-specific economics major, with concentrations in over 18 disciplines in Wharton's academic departments. The degree is a general business degree focused on core business skills. At the graduate level, the Master of Business Administration (MBA) program can be pursued standalone or offers dual studies leading to a joint degree from other schools (e.g., law, engineering, government). Similarly, in addition to its tracks in accounting, finance, operations, statistics, and other academic departments, the doctoral and post-doctoral programs co-sponsors several diploma programs in conjunction with other schools within the university. The college was a pioneer in so-called 'Executive Education'; custom learning experiences that lead to academic enrichment, however with no standing.

Since the establishment of journalistic rankings, Wharton's undergraduate and graduate programs have been consistently ranked in the top tier. Its MBA program is ranked No. 1 in the World according to the Financial Times and No. 1 in the United States according to the 2023 U.S. News & World Report ranking. Meanwhile, Wharton's undergraduate business program has been ranked No. 1 in the United States, and the MBA for Executives No. 2 in the US by U.S. News. MBA graduates of Wharton earn an average $175,000 (USD) first year base pay, the highest of all the leading business schools. Wharton's MBA program is tied for the highest in the United States with an average GMAT score of 732 (97th percentile) for its entering class.

History 

Joseph Wharton, a native Philadelphian, was a leader in industrial metallurgy who built his fortune through the American Nickel Company and Bethlehem Steel Corporation. As Wharton's business grew, he recognized that business knowledge in the United States was only taught through an apprenticeship system, and such a system was not viable for creating a wider economy during the Second Industrial Revolution. After two years of planning, Wharton in 1881 founded the Wharton School of Finance and Economy through a $100,000 initial pledge, making it the first business school established in the United States. ESCP Europe, established in 1819, and a few other business schools were established in Europe prior to Wharton's founding The school was meant to train future leaders to conduct corporations and public organizations in a rapidly evolving industrial era. Wharton was quoted as saying that the school was meant to "instill a sense of the coming strife [in business life]: of the immense swings upward or downward that await the competent or the incompetent soldier in this modern strife."

From the founding of the school, he defined that its goal was "to provide for young men special means of training and of correct instruction in the knowledge and in the arts of modern Finance and Economy, both public and private, in order that, being well informed and free from delusions upon these important subjects, they may either serve the community skillfully as well as faithfully in offices of trust, or, remaining in private life, may prudently manage their own affairs and aid in maintaining sound financial morality: in short, to establish means for imparting a liberal education in all matters concerning Finance and Economy". The school was renamed the Wharton School of Finance and Commerce, in 1902, and formally changed its name to simply Wharton School in 1972.

Early on, the Wharton School faculty was tightly connected to an influential group of businessmen, bankers, and lawyers that made up the larger Philadelphia School of Political Economy. The faculty incorporated social sciences into the Wharton curriculum, as the field of business was still under development. Albert S. Bolles, a lawyer, served as Wharton's first professor, and the school's Industrial Research Unit was established in 1921.

Wharton professor Simon Kuznets, who later won the Nobel Prize in Economics, created statistical data on national output, prices, investment, and capital stock and measured seasonability, cycles, and secular trends of these phenomena. His work laid out what became the standard procedure for measuring the gross national product and the gross domestic product, and he later led an international effort to establish the same statistical information for all national economies. Professor Lawrence Klein, who also won the Nobel Prize in Economics, developed the first econometric model of the U.S. economy, which combined economic theory with mathematics, providing another way to test theories and predict future economic trends.

Wharton professor George W. Taylor is credited with founding the academic field of study known as industrial relations. He served in several capacities in the federal government, most notably as a mediator and arbitrator. During his career, Taylor settled more than 2,000 strikes. In 1967, he helped draft the New York State civil service law that legalized collective bargaining in the state but that also banned strikes by public employees—legislation widely known today as the Taylor Law.

Wharton professor Wroe Alderson (1898–1964) is widely recognized as the most important marketing theorist of the twentieth century and the "father of modern marketing". Wharton professor Paul Green is considered to be the "father of conjoint analysis" for his discovery of the statistical tool for quantification of market research.

Wharton professor Solomon S. Huebner is known widely as "the father of insurance education." He originated the concept of "human life value," which became a standard method of calculating insurance value and need. He established the goal of professionalism in the field of insurance, developed the first collegiate-level program in insurance and chaired the Department of Insurance at Wharton, and contributed greatly to the progress of adult education in this area. Wharton professor Daniel M. McGill was widely regarded as the "dean of the pension industry", whose research contributed to shaping the modern retirement system both in the public and corporate sectors.

In 1946, after ENIAC was created at Penn, Wharton created the first multidisciplinary programs in technology management with the School of Engineering and Applied Science. Wharton faculty began to work closely with AT&T, Merrill Lynch, MasterCard, Prudential Insurance and the New York Stock Exchange in analyzing the strategic and commercial implications of information systems.

The Wharton School's first business professor was an attorney, Albert Bolles. At the time, there were no other business schools, and no business professors could be recruited elsewhere. Bolles, a lawyer by education and training, and business journalist by career seemed to be the best option for Joseph Wharton. Bolles started his career as a lawyer in Connecticut in the second half of the 19th century. After resigning from his law firm, he started pursuing a new career in business journalism and was promoted to the editor role of Bankers Magazine, a trade publication, in 1880. Upon joining the Wharton School, he began teaching business with classes on the law of governing finance and on the processes of commercial banking. Bolles' instruction in finance was influenced by his previous experience in Bankers Magazine: he stressed conservative business practices, drawing on business history as much as he could. In his classes, inflationist Congressmen were "self-interested debtors." Besides teaching, Bolles advocated for several national reforms, including the uniform banking law. Wharton historian Steven A. Sass wrote about him, "Bolles thus fulfilled Joseph Wharton's pedagogic expectations and…got the new school off to a respectable start by the spring of 1883". In 1884, the first five business students were awarded a Bachelor of Finance degree. One graduate, Shiro Shiba, returned to Japan where he would become a member of the Diet, the Japanese parliament, and another, Robert Adams, Jr., later was named U.S. Ambassador to Brazil.

Classes in business and finance abounded at the Wharton School, but it lacked in any other areas of business interest. Edmund J. James, with a doctorate from the University of Halle in Germany, reinvigorated the school's curriculum, starting classes on political finance and administration. Later in 1885, James argued for redesigning the course of study at Wharton with elements of German higher education. He wanted to include training in banking, railroading, merchandising, manufacturing, and other similar branches, and expand the course's length to four years from the initial three. Joseph Wharton in November 1893 pledged an additional $75,000 to the school in order to implement James' ideas in the school's curriculum. A more comprehensive study plan was then rolled out. Between 1895 and 1915, James started teaching at Wharton the new fields of finance and management as they were developing in the business world. The Wharton School improved its reputation from a bunch of academic "misfits," and some of its alumni rose in the U.S. business world. During this period, the school continued to attract additional faculty members and expand its research programs.

Wharton began awarding MBA degrees in 1921. In 1942, during World War II, in the same fashion of other schools, Wharton's full-time faculty dropped dramatically from 165 to 39 by 1944. According to school historians, members of the faculty were called upon for special posts. In 1959, Wharton adopted the curriculum that is now taught in most major business schools: the program was changed with liberal arts education doubling to almost half of the curriculum.  In 1974 the social sciences department, along with the rest of universities liberal arts programs, was moved to the newly University of Pennsylvania School of Arts and Sciences. Since then, Wharton faculty have focused exclusively on various aspects of business education.

Official historical names of the institution include the Wharton School of Finance and Economy, from 1881 to 1901, and the Wharton School of Finance and Commerce, from 1902 to 1971.

The Jay H. Baker Retailing Center at Wharton was permanently endowed by alumnus Jay H. Baker in 2010. It is an interdisciplinary industry research center which was originally established in 2002. The center brings together retail leaders, faculty, and students to discuss the opportunities and challenges of retailers. The Baker Retailing Center also hosts an annual CEO Summit in New York City.

On February 26, 2020, Erika H. James was named dean of the Wharton School, effective July 1, 2020. She is both the first woman and the first African-American to lead the business school.

Campus

Philadelphia campus 
The Philadelphia campus of the Wharton School has four primary buildings, Jon M. Huntsman Hall, Steinberg Hall-Dietrich Hall, Vance Hall and Lauder-Fischer Hall. In addition, the Steinberg Conference Center houses the Aresty Institute of Executive Education.

Jon M. Huntsman Hall is the Wharton School's main building. The building is a 324,000 square foot structure with 48 seminar and lecture halls, 57 group study rooms, and several auditoriums and conference rooms. It was constructed through a donation from Wharton alumnus Jon M. Huntsman. It also has a 4,000 square foot forum, as well as a colloquium space on the top floor. 

Steinberg Hall-Dietrich Hall is a joint 180,000 square foot structure comprising two adjacent halls. It was built in 1952 and expanded in 1983 through a donation from Wharton alumnus Saul Steinberg, and houses the offices of several academic departments at the Wharton School. It also contains lecture halls, conference rooms and common areas for faculty and students.

Vance Hall is a 107,000 square foot structure built in 1972 to house Wharton's graduate programs, administrative offices, lecture halls, and meeting areas.

Lauder-Fischer Hall houses the Joseph H. Lauder Institute for Management and International Studies, and focuses mainly on international business teaching and research initiatives. The Lauder Institute was founded in 1983 by Wharton alumni Leonard Lauder and Ronald Lauder.

In 2014, the Wharton School launched the Student Life Space in Philadelphia's central business district. It is a 20,000 square foot space with conference rooms, meeting rooms and over 20 group study rooms. It also serves as an incubator space for startup companies.

In 2018, it was announced that a new 70,000 square foot campus building for student entrepreneurship would be constructed, following a $25 million donation from the hedge fund manager and philanthropist Nicolai Tangen. The building will be located at 40th and Sansom Streets, and is set to be completed by 2020.

San Francisco campus 

In 2001, Wharton launched a satellite campus in San Francisco, California. The Bay Area campus was created to capitalize on the growing start-up culture and related financing sector of Silicon Valley. It serves as a hub on the West Coast for its students and alumni. As of 2012, the campus is open to executive MBA students and to full-time MBA students, who can decide to spend the spring semester of first year, or fall or spring semesters of second year of the MBA program in San Francisco in the Semester in San Francisco Program. For the full-time MBAs, the Semester in San Francisco Program focuses on entrepreneurship, technology, and venture capital.

Undergraduate program

Admissions process 

Prospective Wharton candidates apply in their senior year of high school either through the early decision (ED) process or regular decision (RD) process. Unlike many other undergraduate business programs where students transfer in after their freshman or second year (University of Virginia's McIntire, Emory's Goizueta, UC Berkeley's Haas), Wharton applicants apply specifically for Wharton during their senior year of high school. These candidates are then grouped with a pool of applicants separate from those applying to the University of Pennsylvania's College of Arts and Sciences (CAS), School of Engineering and Applied Science (SEAS), or School of Nursing. Each of the other three schools also forms its own separate pool of applicants.

The legacy status of applicants, defined as having a parent or another direct relative who attended the same academic institution, may be considered in the admissions process. This correlation has been observed in a number of empirical studies conducted on the nation's most elite schools, with a particular focus on Ivy League universities. Leading universities in the United States cite stronger alumni connections and continued support as the primary reasons for this practice.

Graduation and employment 

Wharton undergraduate students are required to graduate with a B.S. in Economics with at least 1 of 21 current concentrations. Concentrations range from finance and accounting to lesser-known studies such as business analytics and Social Impact & Responsibility. Obtaining a concentration requires a student to take four classes outside of what is required in the core curriculum. Policy has recently changed such that Wharton students can graduate with a maximum of 2 concentrations rather than 3. 
In the 2015–16 school year, 334 employers participated in the on-campus recruiting process; each student received an average of 7.6 first-round interviews and 1.8 job offers. About 48% of Wharton's typical undergraduate class of 650 students go into financial services, with the top sectors being investment banking, investment management, and private equity. The next most common industry after finance is management consulting, which hires approximately 22% of the students, while a significant number of students enter marketing, sales, and the technology industry, particularly in Silicon Valley.

For the Class of 2020, Wharton undergraduate students reported a median first-year base compensation of $86,217.

Graduate programs

MBA program 

The school offers two paths, an MBA for full-time students and an MBA for executives. Students can elect to pursue double majors or individualized majors. During their first year, all students pursue a required core curriculum that covers traditional management disciplines—finance, marketing, statistics, and strategy—as well as the leadership, ethics, and communication skills needed at senior levels of management. Students pick electives in the second year.

Wharton MBA students may pursue a dual degree with the Lauder Institute, Johns Hopkins University's Paul H. Nitze School of Advanced International Studies (SAIS), the John F. Kennedy School of Government at Harvard University, or with one of the graduate schools at the University of Pennsylvania.

MBA students from the Class of 2021 earn an average first-year salary and guaranteed compensation of $155,000. Additionally, the class reported a median sign-on bonus of $30,000 and a median guaranteed bonus of $28,204. The MBA program annually receives around 7,300 applications for the 850 places in the class.

Wharton co-sponsored the Executive Master's in Technology Management Program (EMTM) with the University of Pennsylvania School of Engineering and Applied Science. Graduates received a Master of Science in Engineering (MSE) in the management of technology from the School of Engineering and Applied Science. The EMTM program ended in August 2014.

Wharton is also part of the Wharton-INSEAD Alliance. MBA students from each program can spend one period of study at the partner school, allowing Wharton students access to the INSEAD campuses in both Fontainebleau and Singapore. Students who are interested in careers in technology industries also regularly study at Wharton's San Francisco campus.

Doctoral program 
Wharton offers doctor of philosophy degrees in finance, applied economics, management, and other business fields (as opposed to some schools, which grant DBAs). It takes approximately four to six years to complete the doctoral program.

Executive Education 
The Wharton School also operates the Aresty Institute of Executive Education (commonly known as "Wharton Executive Education"), a center for continuing business education for senior executives. The institute is named in honor of civic leader, business owner, philanthropist, and Wharton alumnus Julian Aresty and his brother Joseph Aresty, who together endowed the Aresty Institute for Executive Education in 1987.

Wharton Executive Education offers programs for executives in areas such as finance, marketing, strategy, and innovation. Each year, more than 10,000 professionals worldwide attend Wharton Executive Education programs in classes taught by full-time Wharton faculty.

Wharton offers more than 50 open enrollment programs for individuals on campuses in Philadelphia, San Francisco, and Beijing, China. Wharton also overs three long-duration open-enrollment programs that confer alumni status upon successful completion. These programs are the Advanced Finance Program, Advanced Management Program, and the General Management Program.

In addition to a large portfolio of open-enrollment programs for individuals, Wharton Executive Education also offers customized programs for organizations. Custom program topic areas include Finance & Value Creation, Leadership Development, Marketing & Sales, and Strategy & Innovation. Industry areas of expertise include Consumer Products, Retail, Energy, Transportation, Financial Services, Health Care, Pharmaceuticals, Manufacturing & Industrials, Professional Services, Technology & Communications.

Wharton Online 
Through its online division, Wharton offers massive open online courses on Coursera with specializations in business and financial modeling, business analytics, entrepreneurship, and business foundations. Wharton Online also offers a Leadership and Management Certificate and a Business Analytics Certificate. The division is accredited by the International Association for Continuing Education and Training (IACET); it was the first online business school to be accredited by this organization.

The COVID-19 pandemic meant a rapid shift towards online teaching, transforming some of the classroom courses into online courses. For years there has been a strong investment in online education, so the school has been able to adapt well to the new circumstances, according to the Financial Times analysis on the adaptation of business schools to COVID-19.

Notable people

Alumni 

Wharton School alumni include Tesla/SpaceX/Twitter CEO Elon Musk, former U.S. president Donald Trump, and billionaire investor Warren Buffett. Other alumni include the current and former CEOs of Fortune 500 companies at Alphabet Inc., Boeing, Comcast, General Electric, Johnson & Johnson, Oracle, Pfizer, PepsiCo.

Faculty

See also 
 List of Ivy League business schools
 List of United States business school rankings
 List of business schools in the United States

Notes

References

Further reading 
 Nicole Ridgway, The Running of the Bulls: Inside the Cutthroat Race from Wharton to Wall Street, Gotham, 2005.
 Steven A. Sass, Pragmatic Imagination: A History of the Wharton School, University of Pennsylvania Press, 1983.
 Emory Richard Johnson, The Wharton School: Its Fifty Years, University of Pennsylvania Press, 1931.

External links